Scott Michael Diamond (born July 30, 1986) is a Canadian former professional baseball pitcher. He played in Major League Baseball (MLB) for the Minnesota Twins and Toronto Blue Jays.

Amateur career
Diamond played college baseball at Binghamton University, for the Binghamton Bearcats under head coach Tim Sinicki. In his freshman season, 2005, he was named America East Rookie of the Year. He played three years at Binghamton before he decided to go pro. He is now a member of the Binghamton University Athletic Hall of Fame. Diamond, Mike Augliera, Lee Sosa and Murphy Smith are the most recent Binghamton pitchers to be taken in the Major League Draft and/or go pro.

He also played collegiate summer baseball in 2006 and 2007 with the Martinsville Mustangs of the Coastal Plain League (CPL). Diamond led the CPL in earned run average (ERA) in 2006, posting a 0.50 ERA in  innings pitched.

Professional career

Minor league career
Diamond was not selected in the 2008 Major League Baseball draft. He signed as an undrafted free-agent with the Atlanta Braves organization.

Diamond played for the Rome Braves and the Myrtle Beach Pelicans in 2008.  He was awarded Myrtle Beach Pelicans pitcher of the year award after recording a 15–3 record and a 2.89 ERA. He played for the Mississippi Braves in 2009 and 2010 before being promoted to the Gwinnett Braves during the 2010 season.

Diamond was on the roster for Canada in the 2009 World Baseball Classic, where he made a relief appearance for three innings in their game against the Italian national baseball team at the Rogers Centre.

Minnesota Twins
On December 9, 2010, Diamond was selected by the Minnesota Twins in the 2010 Rule 5 draft. Towards the conclusion of spring training, the Twins acquired Diamond from the Braves for prospect Billy Bulluck, allowing them to send Diamond to the minors. The Twins purchased his contract on July 17, and he made his MLB debut the following day.

In 2012, Diamond began the season with the Triple-A Rochester Red Wings. After starting six games and compiling a 4–1 record and a 2.60 ERA in  innings, he was called up to the Twins on May 7. On May 8, Diamond beat the Los Angeles Angels of Anaheim, allowing four hits and one walk in seven shutout innings. Diamond then became an everyday starter for the team, recording 8 wins by mid-July.
On July 27, 2012, Diamond pitched his first career complete-game/shutout against the Cleveland Indians. In the start, he allowed only three hits and struck out six batters as the Twins won 11–0. Diamond was ejected by umpire Wally Bell from a game against the Texas Rangers on August 23 after throwing a pitch behind the head of Josh Hamilton. Diamond was suspended for six games as a result of that incident. In his first full season, he led the American League in fewest Walks Allowed per 9 Innings Pitched, allowing only 1.613.

On March 22, 2013, Diamond was placed on the 15-day disabled list to start the 2013 season. Diamond came off the disabled list on April 13. Diamond was optioned to Rochester on August 2. He was recalled on September 9, after Rochester was eliminated from the International League playoffs.

On March 26, 2014, Diamond was placed on waivers. He was outrighted to Triple-A Rochester the next day. On July 12, Diamond was released by the Twins organization.

Cincinnati Reds
On July 15, 2014, Diamond signed a minor league contract with the Cincinnati Reds. He was assigned to their Triple A affiliate Louisville Bats.

Tampa Bay Rays
Diamond signed a minor league contract with the Tampa Bay Rays on April 5, 2015. He elected free agency on November 6, 2015.

Toronto Blue Jays
On November 24, 2015, Diamond signed a minor league contract with the Toronto Blue Jays that includes an invitation to spring training. He was assigned to minor league camp on March 18, 2016. Diamond was called up by the Blue Jays on June 13, and was designated for assignment the following day. On June 17, Diamond was outrighted back to the Triple-A Buffalo Bisons. Diamond elected free agency on October 14, 2016.

SK Wyverns
On December 11, 2016, Diamond signed a one-year, $600,000 contract with the SK Wyverns of the KBO League. He became a free agent after the season.

See also
Rule 5 draft results

References

External links

MiLB.com profile
BaseballAmerican.com profile

1986 births
Living people
Baseball people from Ontario
Binghamton Bearcats baseball players
Buffalo Bisons (minor league) players
Canadian expatriate baseball players in South Korea
Canadian expatriate baseball players in the United States
Durham Bulls players
Gigantes del Cibao players
Canadian expatriate baseball players in the Dominican Republic
Gwinnett Braves players
KBO League pitchers
Louisville Bats players
Major League Baseball pitchers
Major League Baseball players from Canada
Minnesota Twins players
Mississippi Braves players
Myrtle Beach Pelicans players
Rome Braves players
Rochester Red Wings players
SSG Landers players
Sportspeople from Guelph
Toronto Blue Jays players
World Baseball Classic players of Canada
2009 World Baseball Classic players